Harriet Dansowaa Bruce-Annan (birth name: Grace Akosua Dansowaa Ani-Agyei; born 1965 in Accra, Ghana) is a Ghanaian programmer and humanitarian living in Düsseldorf, Germany. She has become known as the founder of African Angel, a charity organisation which supports and provides training for children from the slums of Accra's Bukom district.

Life and work 
Bruce-Annan was born in Accra in 1965. She spent her childhood in Adabraka and regularly visited her grandmother, who lived in a slum called Bukom. Despite all the suffering prevailing in her community, she still got along in her childhood. With the help of her uncle, she later studied programming in Ghana. Her first job was with a German computer company. In 1990, Bruce-Annan emigrated with her husband to Germany, after he had promised her a better education in Europe. However, following several cases of abuse, she fled to a women's shelter in Düsseldorf. There, she first worked as a nursing assistant, then as a lavatory attendant at the Düsseldorf fair and at the Golden Unicorn pub on Ratinger Straße. While at Düsseldorf, she began collecting money to help orphans in the slums of Bukom in Accra. On September 15, 2002, together with six others, Bruce-Annan founded the African Angel Association. The Association supports children from the Bukom slum, particularly orphans, by financing their education and training.

In 2008, Bruce-Annan was invited to the Berlin Senate conference, where the role of knowledge in international migration was discussed. In 2009, she appeared in on NDR television and on Markus Lanz talk shows. Bruce-Annan has been touring Germany and Austria for several years to present her project.

Awards 
On March 31, 2011, she was named the "heroine of everyday life" by the magazine Bild der Frau at a gala in Berlin and was awarded prize money of 30,000 euros. Am 31.

Bruce-Annan was also awarded the Cross of Merit on the ribbon of the Federal Republic of Germany  on the occasion of World Women's Day in March 2013.

Literature 

 Beate Rygiert: African Angel: changing the world with 50 cents / Harriet Bruce-Annan. Lübbe publishing house, Bergisch Gladbach 2009, .

References

External links 

 Offizielle Website von African Angel e.V
 
 Video Harriet Bruce-Annan: ''Every penny for home children - a loo woman donates everything"

1965 births
People from Düsseldorf
People from Accra
Recipients of the Cross of the Order of Merit of the Federal Republic of Germany
Computer programmers
Women humanitarians
German philanthropists
German women philanthropists
Living people
Ghanaian emigrants to Germany
20th-century Ghanaian women
21st-century Ghanaian women
Bruce family of Ghana